Mitra Hajjar (born February 4, 1977) is an Iranian actress. She has received various accolades, including a Crystal Simorgh, in addition to nominations for three Hafez Award, an Iran Cinema Celebration Award and an Iran's Film Critics and Writers Association Award.

Career
Hajjar started acting with "Strangely" directed by Ahmad Amini. She has also starred in TV series, most notably "Young Police". She has acted in the theatrical show "Uncle Vania" in France. In 2005, she left Iran for France, and then went to America to study directorship. She lived abroad for 3 years, and she also played in an episode of the American Show "Smith". She received a nomination for the best actress in a supporting role for the movie "Long Goodbye". Hajjar was named the best actress in her film Wishbone.

Selected filmography
 The Cry, 1999
 Born under Libra, 2001
 Protest, 2000
 Killing Mad Dogs, 2001
 Nights of Tehran 2001
 Rokhsareh, 2002
 The Poisonous Mushroom, 2002
 Pink (2003 film), 2003
 Alghazali - The Alchemist of happiness, 2004
 The Intruder, 2002
 Loser, 2002
 The Fugitive, 2003
 The Crime, 2004
 It's Winter, 2006
 The Secrets, 2007
 This Is Not A Love Song, 2007
 The Hunter, 2010
 Anahita, 2010
Motherless, 2022

References

External links

1977 births
Living people
People from Mashhad
Iranian film actresses
Iranian stage actresses
Iranian television actresses
21st-century Iranian actresses
Crystal Simorgh for Best Actress winners